Gaudí is a defunct metro station of the Barcelona Metro. The Line 5 train continues to pass through the station. The upper lobby has been converted into an office for retired TMB workers.

History
Built in the 1960s, the station was originally to be part of the old Line II of the Barcelona Metro. However plans changed and the station was rerouted to part of the Line 5. Because of its close proximity to the station Sagrada Familia, it was ultimately decided not to open the station. As a result, the Gaudí station was fully constructed but has never been opened to the public. Its main lobby currently serves as a retirement office for Barcelona Metro employees.

See also
List of disused Barcelona Metro stations
Correos (Barcelona Metro)
Banc (Barcelona Metro)

References

Defunct railway stations in Spain
Disused Barcelona Metro stations